The 2014 Commonwealth Fencing Championships was held in Largs, Scotland between the 10th and 15 November 2014 at the Inverclyde National Sports Training Centre

Venue

The venue was Inverclyde National Sports Training Centre in Largs, Scotland

Host & Organisers
The event was hosted and run by Scottish Fencing and is overseen by the Commonwealth Fencing Federation.  The event director was Chris Hyde and the event manager was Roy Clarke.

Medallists - Men's Events

Medallists - Women's Events

Medal table

Awards
The event was nominated for a 2015 Scottish Thistle Award, EventScotland's Tourism Awards in recognition of the benefits to the local area of North Ayrshire.  The event was part of Homecoming Scotland 2014

References

External links
 The 2014 Commonwealth Fencing Championships, Largs

Fencing
C